Alberto Mazzoncini (born 14 February 1991) is a South African cricketer. He is a left-handed batsman and left-arm medium-pace bowler who played for Griqualand West. Between 2009 and 2012, Mazzoncini played six times in First-class cricket, 16 in List A cricket matches and five Twenty20 games.

He was born in Kimberley and attended Diamantveld High School.

Mazzoncini played for Griqualand West Under-19s in the CSA Under-19s competition between January 2008 and December 2009. 

Mazzoncini made his first-class debut during the 2009–10 season, against Boland.

References

External links
Alberto Mazzoncini at Cricket Archive 

1991 births
Living people
South African cricketers
Griqualand West cricketers
South African people of Italian descent